Stefán Hörður Grímsson (31 March 1919, Hafnarfjörður – 18 September 2002, Reykjavík) was an Icelandic modernist, one of the Atom Poets. His first book of poetry came out in 1946, but he gained attention for his second book of poems in 1951; he published a third book of poetry in 1970.

External links
Iceland literature site

Stefan Hordur Grimsson
1919 births
2002 deaths
Stefan Hordur Grimsson